Sprat Morrison is a children's book published in 1972, and the first novel written by Jamaican author Jean D'Costa. The book is about the adventures of a young boy living in Papine, a suburb of Kingston. It is widely studied in Caribbean schools.

Sprat Morrison is part of the book series Horizons. Horizons is a series targeted towards 11 to 14-year-old Caribbean citizens.

References

1972 novels
Children's novels
Jamaican novels
Novels set in Jamaica
1972 children's books
1972 debut novels